Charles William Leat (6 December 1855 – 18 December 1937) was an English first-class cricketer. Leat was a right-handed batsman who bowled right-arm roundarm fast, but played primarily as a wicketkeeper.

Leat made his first-class debut for Hampshire against the Marylebone Cricket Club in the 1878.

From 1878 to 1885, which was Hampshire's final season with first-class status until the 1895 County Championship, Leat represented Hampshire in sixteen first-class matches, with Leat's final first-class appearance for Hampshire coming against Kent. In his sixteen matches, Leat scored 323 runs at an average of 11.53, with a single half-century, which yielded his highest first-class score of 63 against Kent in 1884. With the ball Leat took two wickets at a bowling average of 24.50, with best figures of 2/10. Leat played primarily as a wicketkeeper, where he took 21 catches and made a single stumping.

Leat died at Ringwood, Hampshire on 18 December 1937.

External links
Charles Leat at Cricinfo
Charles Leat at CricketArchive
Matches and detailed statistics for Charles Leat

1855 births
1937 deaths
People from Ringwood, Hampshire
English cricketers
Hampshire cricketers
Wicket-keepers